Creative Persons is a biographical television series which was co-produced by broadcasters in Canada, Germany, the United Kingdom and the United States.

Premise
This series was produced by Allan King Associates with support from BR (Germany), BBC (United Kingdom), CBC (Canada) and NET (United States). Each episode featured a particular person in the field of art or design.

Scheduling
This half-hour series was broadcast in Canada on CBC Television Wednesdays at 9:00 p.m. (Eastern) from 3 July to 25 September 1968.

Episodes
 "Who is Maurice Béjart?" (choreographer) - Roger Graef director
 "Who is Pierre Boulez?" (composer) - Roger Graef director
 "Who is Max Frisch?" (architect, novelist, playwright) - William Brayne director
 "Who is Walter Gropius?" (architect) - Roger Graef director
 "Who is James Jones?" (author) - Allan King director
 "Who is Sean Kenny?" (designer) - William Brayne director
 "Who is Jacques Lipchitz?" (sculptor) - Roger Graef director
 "Who is Norman Mailer?" (writer)
 "Who is Oscar Niemeyer?" (architect) - William Brayne director
 "Who is Sonny Rollins?" (musician) - Dick Fontaine director
 "Who is Richard Smith?" (painter) - Denis Postle director
 "Who is Rufino Tamayo?" (painter) - Roger Graef director
 "Who is Victor Vasarely?" (painter)

References

External links
 

1960s Canadian documentary television series
1968 Canadian television series debuts
1968 Canadian television series endings
BBC Television shows
CBC Television original programming
Works about people in arts occupations